"Stars" is the first single released from American rock band Switchfoot's fifth album Nothing Is Sound. "Stars" was released to radio on June 28, 2005, and again on July 5. It was the most-added song on Modern Rock Radio in its first week of release and peaked at number sixteen on the US Modern Rock chart. The song was certified gold as a digital single on December 13, 2005. It is the band's third most successful song, behind previous hits "Meant to Live" and "Dare You to Move". On iTunes, an acoustic mix of the track is available.

Lyrical themes
In an August 2011 interview with Songfacts, lead singer Jon Foreman explained the inspiration for "Stars":

In another interview, Foreman said that "Stars" is about perspective, a song about stepping back in the midst of chaos and looking at the stars; the idea of anti-entropy, implying there must be something keeping the world together. "The first verse looks at things from Descartes perspective, pinning the center of the universe on the individual. 'Maybe I've been the problem,' maybe I'm overcast, falling apart, etc... The second verse talks about our world from the perspective of the stars looking down on earth from the eternal dance of gravity and motion."

The song is a fan favorite for its introspective lyrics and reverberant, aggressive sound.

Music videos
The music video for this song was filmed at Universal Studios, mostly underwater.  The video features the band playing in an outdoor setting, but as the video progresses, they can be seen "floating" in a watery environment. At the apex of the song, right before the bridge of the song, this environment bursts, and the band plays in the rain until the end of the video.

The video was directed by Scott Speer and produced by Coleen Haynes.

A music video based on a shortened version of this song was used for American Idol, in partnership with Ford, in a Mustang commercial.

Track listings
UK CD single
 Stars (Album Version)
 Stars (Acoustic Version)
 Dare You To Move (Acoustic Version)
 Stars (Video)

Charts

Certifications

Awards

In 2006, the song won a Dove Award for Short Form Music Video of the Year at the 37th GMA Dove Awards. It was also nominated for Rock/Contemporary Recorded Song of the Year.

References

External links
Jon's thoughts
Official music video

2005 singles
Switchfoot songs
Music videos directed by Scott Speer
Songs written by Jon Foreman
Post-grunge songs
Song recordings produced by John Fields (record producer)
2005 songs